Gordon W. Lloyd was an architect of English origin, whose work was primarily in the American Midwest. After being taught by his uncle, Ewan Christian, at the Royal Academy, Lloyd moved to Detroit in 1858. There he established himself as a popular architect of Episcopal churches and cathedrals in the region, mostly in the states of Michigan, Ohio and Pennsylvania. In addition to churches, Lloyd designed several secular works, such as commercial buildings, residences and an insane asylum. Though his office was in Detroit, Lloyd lived across the river in Windsor, Ontario, Canada.

Main works 

Anthony Dudgeon Residence (1859) 1859 East River Road, Grosse Ile, Michigan
Samuel T. Douglass Residence (1859) 1859 East River Road, Grosse Ile, Michigan
Alexander H. Dey Residence (1862) 965 East Jefferson Avenue Detroit, MI Demolished in 1960s
Christ Church Detroit, (1863),960 East Jefferson Avenue, Detroit, MI
Trinity Episcopal Church (1864) 101 E. Mansion Street, Marshall, MI.
Sidney D. Miller Residence (1864) 1432 East Jefferson Avenue, Detroit, MI. Demolished in 1955.
Seventh Street School (1866) 2525 Brooklyn, Detroit, Mi. Demolished in 1899.
Detroit & Milwaukee Railway Company Passenger Depot (1866) 400 Atwater, Detroit, MI. Demolished in 1973.
Central United Methodist Church, (1866),23 East Adams, Detroit, MI
Our Lady of Help Roman Catholic Church (1867) 3156 East Congress, Detroit, MI. Demolished in 1968.
Saint Andrew's Episcopal Church (1867) 306 North Division Street, Ann Arbor, MI.
Cathedral of St. Paul (Erie, Pennsylvania), (1866) 134 W. Seventh St.
St. James Episcopal Church, Milwaukee, Wisconsin, (1867),833 West Wisconsin Avenue
St. James Episcopal Church, Grosse Ile, Michigan, (1867), 25150 East River Road
First Congregational Church (1868) 403 South Jefferson Avenue, Saginaw, MI.
Thomas A. Parker House, (1868), 975 East Jefferson Avenue, Detroit, MI
Trinity Episcopal Church (1868) 304 South Monroe Street, Monroe, MI
John Pridgeon Residence (1868) 2666 Woodward Avenue, Detroit, MI. Demolished in 1890s
Grace Episcopal Church (1869) 550 W Fort Street, Detroit, MI. Demolihsed in 1920s
Trinity Episcopal Church, Columbus, Ohio, (1869),125 East Broad Street.
Grace Episcopal Church (1870)115 South Main Street, Mount Clemens, MI.
Church of the Holy Spirit, Kenyon College, Gambier, Ohio, (1871)
Saint Mary of Good Counsel Catholic Church, Adrian, Michigan, (1871) 305 Division Street.
Dr, William Brodie Residence (1871) 304 West Lafayette Boulevard Detroit MI. Demolished in 1914.
Saint Vincent's Female Orphan Asylum (1872) 529 McDougall, Detroit, MI. Demolished in 1960s
Trinity Cathedral Episcopal Church (1872) 328 Sixth Street, Pittsburgh, PA.
Church of the Holy Spirit (1872) 102 College Park Street, Gambier, OH.
 Chapter House for Trinity Anglican Church, London, Ontario, Canada, 1872-1873
 Saint Paul's Episcopal Church (1873) 711 South Saginaw, Flint, MI.
 James McMillan Residence (1873) 1411 East Jefferson Avenue, Detroit, MI. Demolisshed in 1931.
 Joseph A. Moross Residence (1873) 6371 Woodward Avenue, Detroit, MI. Demolished in 1960s
 Forest Hill Cemetery gatehouse, Ann Arbor, Michigan (1874)
Hone of the Friendless (1874) 7 West Waren, Detroit, MI. Demolished in 1927.
C. J. Whitney & Company Building (1874) 140 West Fort Street, Demolished in 1911.
All Saints Episcopal Church (1874) 252 Grand Street, Saugatuck, MI.
Saint Paul's Episcopal Church (1875) 201 East Ridge Road , Marquette, MI.
Allan Shelden Residence (1875) 630 West Fort Street, Detroit, MI. Demolished in 1918.
Abstract Building (1875) 125 West Lafayette, Demolished in 1912.
Simon Heavenrich Residence (1875) 75 Winder Street, Detroit, MI. Demolished in 1931.
Emory Wendell Residence (1875) 1397 East Jefferson Avenue, Detroit, MI. Demolished in 1920s.
John S. Newberry Summer Residence (1875) 99 Lake Shore Drive Grosse Pointe Farms, MI. Demolished in 1910s
James McMillan. Summer Residence (1875) 100 Lake Shore Drive Grosse Pointe Farms, MI. Demolished in 1910s
Whitney Opera House (1875)  200 West Fort Street, Detroit, MI. Demolished in 1889.
Grace Episcopal Church, Galion, Ohio, 1875, NRHP
Elmwood Cemetery Gatehouse (1876) Detroit, MI.
First Congregational Church of Ann Arbor (1876) 608 East William, Ann Arbor, MI.
Saint Paul's Episcopal Church (1876) 4120 Euclid Avenue, Cleveland, OH.
John S. Newberry Residence (1876) 1363 East Jefferson Avenue, Detroit, MI. Demolished in 1961.
Edward Y. Swift Residence (1876) 804 West Lafayette Boulevard, Detroit, MI. Demolished in 1960s
Henry P. Baldwin Residence (1877) 410 West Fort Street, Detroit, Mi. Demolished in 1930s
Detroit Savings Bank Building (1878) 508 Griswold, Detroit, MI. Demolished in 1929.
The Carpenter Block (1879) 1 West Jefferson, Detroit, MI. Demolished in 1950s
Board of Trade Building (1879) 35 West Jefferson Avenue, Detroit, MI. Demolished in 1950s
 Newberry & McMillan Building/Equity Building (1879) 428-432 Griswold, Detroit, MI. Demolished in 1929.
 Saint Mary's Hospital (1879) 1420 St. Antoine, Detroit, MI Demolished in 1990.
 Heavenrich Borthers Building (1880) 129 West Jefferson, Detroit, MI. Demolished in 1930s
 Archibald G. Lindsay Residence (1880) 4639 Woodward Avenue, Detroit, MI. Demolished in 1914.
 Palms Block (1881) 110 East Jefferson Avenue, Detroit, MI. Destroyed by fire in 1893.
 Traugott Schmit House (1881) 1571 East Jefferson Detroit MI. Demolished in 1960s
 Home for the Aged Little Sisters of the Poor (1881) 1825 Scott Street, Detroit, MI. Demolished in 1930s
 Westminster Presbyterian Church (1881) 3711 Woodward Avenue, Detroit, MI. Demolished in 1919.
 George F. Moore Residence (1881) 5106 Woodward Avenue, Detroit, MI. Demolished in 1925.
 Henry B. Ledyard Summer Residence (1882) 259 Lake Shore Drive, Grosse Pointe Farms, MI. Demolished in 1910s
 Saint John's Episcopal Church (1883) 123 North Michigan Avenue, Saginaw, MI.
Parker Block, (1883) 1075 Woodward Avenue, Detroit, MI. Destroyed by fire in 1990.
Central Police Station (1883) 735 Randolph, Detroit, MI. Demolished in 1928.
Commercial Building (1885) 200-218 West Jefferson, Detroit, MI. Demolished in 1980s
St. Luke's Episcopal Church, Kalamazoo, 1885
Engineering Shops Building (1885) 913 South University Avenue, University of Michigan, Ann Arbor, MI.
Russel A. Alger Residence (1885) 510 West Fort Street, Detroit, MI. Demolished in 1937.
Saint Andrew's Episcopal Church Parish House (1886) 617 East Huron Street, Ann Arbor, MI.
 Bishop Worthington Residence, Omaha, Nebraska, 1885
"Building 50", (formerly Northern Michigan Asylum), Traverse City, Michigan, 1885, NRHP
Brown Brothers Cigar Factory (1887) 119 State Street, Detroit, MI
Wayne Hotel (1887) 220 Third Avenue, Detroit, MI. Demolished in 1931.
Henry Ledyard House (1887) 1545 East Jefferson. Detroit MI. Demolished in 1960s
Grace Hospital (1888) 4160 John R, Detroit, MI, Demolished in 1979.
Dowling Hall, University of Detroit, 1887
R. H. Traver Company Building (1889) 1211-1219 Woodward Avenue, Detroit, MI
William Reed & Company Building (1890) 426-430 West Larned, Detroit, Mi. Demolished in 1984.
Detroit College (1890) 651 East Jefferson Avenue, Detroit, MI.
Laura Rust Residence (1890) 3625 Woodward Avenue, Detroit, MI. Demolished in 1950s
Wright-Kay Building, (1891) 1500 Woodward Avenue, Detroit, MI.
D. M. Ferry Company Building (1891) 400 Monroe, Detroit, MI.
Women's Hospital and Foundlings Home (1891) 443 East Forest, Detroit, MI. Demolished in 1940s
Detroit Telephone Exchange Building (1894) 116 Clifford, Detroit, MI. Extensively modified in the 60s.
David Whitney House, (1894) 4421 Woodward Avenue, Detroit, MI.
Commercial Building (1898) 1236 Randolph, Detroit, MI.
SS Peter & Paul Parish School (1899) 601 East Larned, Detroit, MI. Demolished in 1963.

See also
Architecture of metropolitan Detroit

References

External links
 LLOYD, Gordon William (1832-1904). Biographical Dictionary of Architects in Canada 1800–1950. 

1832 births
1905 deaths
19th-century American architects
19th-century English architects
Canadian architects
British emigrants to the United States
Architects from London